Stark Raving Mad is a 2002 film, produced by A Band Apart, about a heist pulled during a rave. The film was directed and written by Drew Daywalt and David Schneider. It stars Seann William Scott, Lou Diamond Phillips, Timm Sharp, Patrick Breen, John B. Crye, Monet Mazur, Suzy Nakamura, C. Ernst Harth, and Dave Foley.  The movie featured soundtrack by John Digweed.

Synopsis
The plot follows a linear structure, encompassing the events of one night in a nightclub which has been hired for the night by protagonist Ben (Seann William Scott). The owner is unhappy with noise levels, fearing loss of his license, but noise levels is exactly what they want. The noise is specific cover for an illicit and complex bank heist orchestrated by the main character as a means of stealing a revered, ancient Chinese statuette and clearing his and his late brother's debt with a local Chinese crime lord. Ben must complete this task before dawn in order to spare his own life. As such, he hires three "experienced" bank robbers to perform the actual act, while he and his assistant ensure that the club night runs smoothly and without incident. However, such is not the case. Two FBI agents in the club (actually checking on a drugs deal) further thwart their plan, but a Chinese food delivery boy comes in on the plan and helps out giving cover stories for the loud bangs from the basement.

Ultimately, he clears out money from the bank vault and conspires that both the crime lord and his rival Chinese gang are both in the vault when the alarm goes off. The money belongs to the crime lord under a different name and he is found guilty of stealing his own money.

Cast
Seann William Scott as Ben McGewan
Timm Sharp as Rikki Simms
Patrick Breen as Jeffrey Jay
John B. Crye as Jake Nealson (as John Crye)
Suzy Nakamura as Betty Shin (as Suzi Nakamura)
Lou Diamond Phillips as Gregory
Dave Foley as Roy
Kavan Smith as Michael Frakes
Paul Hungerford as Scott
Monet Mazur as Vanessa
C. Ernst Harth as Dirk
Jody Racicot as D.J.
Terry Chen as Jin Sun
Yee Jee Tso as Chan (Gang Member #1)
Ty Olsson as Nate (Goon)
Carl McDonald as Mitchell (Trannie)
Reagan Dale Neis as Susan, Roy's under-age daughter known as Kitten
Adam Arkin as the nightclub owner

External links 
 
 
 

2002 films
2000s gang films
2000s heist films
A Band Apart films
American gang films
American heist films
Summit Entertainment films
Newmarket films
2000s English-language films
2000s American films